João José Mendes dos Santos (born 6 May 1964), known as João Santos, is a Portuguese swimmer. He competed at the 1984 Summer Olympics and the 1988 Summer Olympics.

References

External links
 

1964 births
Living people
Portuguese male swimmers
Olympic swimmers of Portugal
Swimmers at the 1984 Summer Olympics
Swimmers at the 1988 Summer Olympics
Place of birth missing (living people)